Aegokeras caespitosa is a species of flowering plants of the family Apiaceae and the only species of genus Aegokeras. It is endemic to Turkey.

References

Apioideae
Taxa named by Constantine Samuel Rafinesque
Monotypic Apioideae genera